Walter Stewart (or Steward) was a Scottish courtier and politician who sat in the House of Commons from 1624 to 1625.

Life
He was the third son of Walter Stewart, 1st Lord Blantyre.

Stewart was admitted to Gray's Inn on 9 March 1620 when he was a Gentleman of the Privy Chamber to James I. In 1624, he was elected Member of Parliament for Monmouth Boroughs but was unseated on petition on 28 March 1624 on the objection that he was a "Scotchman" and not naturalised. However he was re-elected MP for Monmouth in 1625 without further question.

Stewart is also said to have been a qualified doctor. He left England in 1649 for France, where he was court physician to Queen Henrietta Maria. He died in or by 1657.

Family
Stewart married a dresser to Queen Henrietta Maria, Sophia Carew, daughter of Sir George Carew and Thomazine Godolphin. Their children included Frances Stewart, Duchess of Richmond and Sophia Bulkeley.

References

Year of birth missing
Year of death missing
Members of Gray's Inn
17th-century Scottish medical doctors
English MPs 1624–1625
English MPs 1625
Gentlemen of the Privy Chamber
Younger sons of barons
Court of Charles I of England